The Superstition Mountains is a range of mountains in Arizona located to the east of the Phoenix metropolitan area. They are anchored by Superstition Mountain, a large mountain that is a popular recreation destination for residents of the Phoenix, Arizona, area. They are roughly bounded by U.S. Route 60 on the south, Arizona State Route 88 on the northwest, and Arizona State Route 188 on the northeast.

History and description
The mountains were once known in Spanish as Sierra de la Espuma ("Foam Mountains").

The mountains are in the federally designated Superstition Wilderness Area, and include a variety of natural features in addition to its namesake mountain. 
Weavers Needle, a prominent landmark and rock climbing destination set behind and to the east of Superstition Mountain, is a tall eroded volcanic remnant that plays a significant role in the legend of the Lost Dutchman's Gold Mine. Numerous hiking trails cross the mountains from multiple access points, including the Peralta Trailhead, the most popular. Peralta Canyon, on the northeast side of Superstition Mountain, contains a popular trail that leads up to Fremont Saddle, which provides a very picturesque view of Weavers Needle.  Miner's Needle is another prominent formation in the wilderness and a popular hiking destination. Lost Dutchman State Park, located on the west side of Superstition Mountain, includes several short hiking and mountain bike trails.

Circlestone includes ancient stone monuments.

As with most of the terrain surrounding the Phoenix metropolitan area, the Superstition Mountains have a desert climate, with high summer temperatures and a handful of perennial sources of water. The elevation in the more remote, eastern portion of the wilderness is higher than the western portion, which lowers temperatures slightly.

Legends 
The legend of the Lost Dutchman's Gold Mine centers around the Superstition Mountains. According to the legend, a German immigrant named Jacob Waltz discovered a mother lode of gold in the Superstition Wilderness and revealed its location on his deathbed in Phoenix in 1891 to Julia Thomas, a boarding-house owner who had taken care of him for many years. Several mines have been claimed to be the actual mine that Waltz discovered, but none of those claims have been verified. Waltz was a miner at Vulture Mine, where he likely stole the gold and came up with the secret mine to explain his theft. The legends and lore of the Superstition Mountains can be experienced at the Superstition Mountain Museum on the Apache Trail where artifacts of the Lost Dutchman are on display.

Some Apaches believe that the hole leading down into the lower world, or hell, is located in the Superstition Mountains.  Winds blowing from the hole are supposed to be the cause of severe dust storms in the metropolitan region.

Nearby towns and cities 
 Apache Junction, Arizona
 Gold Canyon, Arizona
 Mesa, Arizona
 Superior, Arizona
 Tortilla Flat, Arizona

Gallery

See also
 List of wilderness areas of the United States
 List of mountain ranges of Arizona
 Wilderness Act

References

External links

 HikeArizona.com: Numbered Trails Map
 Official Apache Trail website: Superstition Mountains
 Tonto National Forest: Superstition Wilderness Area Forest Service information
  Wilderness.net: Superstition Wilderness Area
 GORP.com: Superstition Wilderness
 Ajpl.org: History of the Superstitions
 JustRoughinIt.com: Superstition Wilderness Average Climate

 
Arizona transition zone mountain ranges
Mountain ranges of the Sonoran Desert
Mountain ranges of Maricopa County, Arizona
Mountain ranges of Pinal County, Arizona
Mountain ranges of Gila County, Arizona
Phoenix metropolitan area
Religious places of the indigenous peoples of North America
Wilderness areas of Arizona
Protected areas of Gila County, Arizona
Protected areas of Maricopa County, Arizona
Protected areas of Pinal County, Arizona
Mountain ranges of Arizona
IUCN Category Ib
Tonto National Forest
Protected areas established in 1939